Asian Art Museum is the usual name for a number of museums, including:

 The Asian Art Museum (San Francisco)
 The Asiatic Museum, in St. Petersburg, Russia
 The Seattle Asian Art Museum

It may also refer to:
 The Musée Cernuschi, in Paris, France, officially the Asian Arts Museum of the City of Paris
 The Guimet Museum, in Paris, France, officially the Guimet National Museum of Asian Arts
 The Museum of Asian Art in Berlin, Germany
 The Museum of Asian Art of Corfu in Corfu, Greece
 The National Museum of Asian Art, in Washington, D.C., comprises the Freer Gallery of Art and the Arthur M. Sackler Gallery

See also
 List of museums of Asian art